Still (sometimes written Stile) is a town and commune in El M'Ghair District, El Oued Province, Algeria. According to the 2008 census it has a population of 4,978, up from 3,545 in 1998, and an annual growth rate of 3.5%.

Climate

Still has a hot desert climate (Köppen climate classification BWh), with very hot summers and mild winters. Rainfall is light and sporadic, and summers are particularly dry.

Transportation
Still is on the N3 which connects Biskra in the north to Touggourt in the south. The N48 leaves the N3 just south of Still, leading southeast to El Oued.

Education

3.6% of the population has a tertiary education, and another 14.7% has completed secondary education. The overall literacy rate is 69.0%, and is 77.3% among males and 60.2% among females.

Localities
The commune of Still is composed of one locality:
Home of CFL Bust QB Josh Struver 

Still

References

Neighbouring towns and cities

Communes of El Oued Province
Cities in Algeria
Algeria